This is a list of Bhairava temples.

India

Andhra Pradesh 

 Sri Kaala Bhairava temple (inside Sri Manikyamba sametha Bhimeswara Swamy temple), Daksharaamam, East Godavari 
Kalabhairava Guru Sansthan, Kalabhairava Deeksha Ghat, Swarnakarshana Bhairava Swamy, Aryapuram, Rajahmundry
 Sri Kaala Bhairava temple (inside Sri Puruhootika sametha Kukkuteswara swamy temple), Pitapuram, East Godavari District
 Swayambho Sri Sri Sri Bhairava Swamy Temple in Bhimavaram, West Godavari, Andhra Pradesh
 Sri Bhairava Swamy Temple, Ainavilli, East Godavari District
 Sri Kala Bhairava Swamy Temple, Bhairavapalem (near Yanam), East Godavari District

 Naga Bhirava Kona, P.K.Padu, Somasila, SPSR Nellore District, Andhra Pradesh
 Bhairava sela or Bayyanna sela in Srisailam, Andhra Pradesh
 Kaal Bhairva Temple at Ratanpur (considered to be guardian deity of Mahamaya Temple)
 Bhairava Kona, Near Pamur, Prakasam, Andhra Pradesh
 Kala Bhairava in Mruthyunjaya Swamy Temple, Yogimallavaram Village, Near Tirupati, Andhra Pradesh
 Sri Santhana Prapthi Kaala Bhairava, Ramagiri, Andhra Pradesh
 Kala Bhairava in Valeeshwara swamy Temple in Ramagiri Village between Pitchatur and Nagalapuram 
 Bhogaswara Swamy Temple Kala Bhairava Swamy near Nandyal Kurnool district
Kalabhairava Temple, Siddarampuram, Anantapur district
 Skandagiri Temple, Secunderabad
 Bhairava Swamy Temple, Bhairavavaaka, Simhachalam, Visakhapatnam
 Sri Asta Kala Biarava Swamy Temple, Bommarsapalli, Chittorr
 Sri Kala Bhairava Swamy Temple,near Gram Panchayath, G.Moolapalem,Yedurlanka, East Godavari

Assam 
 Mahabhairav Temple, Tezpur, Assam

Bihar 
 Kaal Bahairav Temple, Barhara, Rampatti, Madhubani.

Delhi and NCR 
 Shri Kilkari Bhairava Temple, near Purana Qila, New Delhi, Delhi.
 Pracheen Kaal Bhairav Mandir and Swarn Akarshan Bhairav Mandir, Jhandewalan Extension, New Delhi 
 Prachin Kaal Bhairav Mandir, near Purana Qila, New Delhi, Delhi 
 Pracheen Bhairava Temple, Nehru Place, New Delhi, Delhi
Prachin Shri Batuk Bhairav Mandir, Nehru Park New Delhi

Goa 
 Kalabhairav Temple, Dhargal

Gujarat 
 Bhairavnath Temple, Maninagar, Ahmedabad, Gujarat
 Shree Kala Bhairavnath Mahadev, NH-8, Bhairav Gaun, Kamrej, Surat, Gujarat
 Batuk Bhairav Temple, Bidada, Kutch district, Gujarat
 Kaal Bhairav Temple, Idar outskirts, Aravalli range, Gujarat
Ashta Bhairav Temple, Sidhpur, Gujarat
 Bhairavnath Temple, Palitana, Bhavnagar district, Gujarat
 Bhairava Japa, sacred jumping rock, Girnar Mountain, Junagadh
 Kaal Bhairavdada Temple, Patan, Patan district, Gujarat
 Kalbhairavnath Mahadev Temple, Bhairav, Surat district, Gujarat
 Kaal bhairav temple, Sarsai, Visavadar, Junagadh
 Kaal Bhairav Temple, Kerali Village, Rajkot, Gujarat

Himachal Pradesh
 Mahakal Vajra Bhairava Temple, Lahul Spiti district, Himachal Pradesh
 Batuk Bhairav Temple, Mandi, Himachal Pradesh

Jammu and Kashmir 
 Bhairav Temple, Vaishnodevi complex, Jammu and Kashmir

Jharkhand 
 Bhomia ji Temple at Jain Swetambar Kothi, Madhuban, Jharkhand

Karnataka 
Sri Pralayakalada Veerabhadra Swamy Temple, Gavipuram
Bhairav Picture inside Aakash Bhairav Temple
Kannalli Sri Veerabhadra Swamy Temple, Sukeshtra
Sri Veerabhadra Swamy Temple, Thindlu
Jodi Veerabhadra Swamy Temple, Machohalli
Sri Veerabhadra Swamy Temple, Mallasandra
Sri Veerabhadra Swamy Temple hill, Banashankari.
Sri Veerabhadra Swamy Temple, Hagadur.
Sri Veerabhadra Swamy Temple, Vasudevapuram.
Sri Veerabhadra Swamy Temple, Attur Layout.
Sri Bhadrakali Ammanavara Sametha Sri Veerabhadra Swamy Devalaya, Devarahosahalli.
Sri Veerabhadra Swamy Temple, Anugondanahalli., Bengaluru, Karnataka.
Sri Kalabhairaveswara swamy Temple, Sri Kshetra Adichunchanagiri, Mandya Dt.
Sri Mahakala Bhairava Temple, Karamogaru, Gurupura, Mangalore Taluk, Dakshina Kannada District
Sri Kalabhairaveshwara Swamy Temple and Chikkarasinakere Basava (Holy Bull), Chikkarasinakere, Maddur Taluk, Mandya District
Sri Ananda Kalabhairava temple (Nithyananda peetham Bengaluru Aadheenam, Bidadi
 Kalabhairaveshvara Temple, Double Road, 4th cross, Rajarajeswari Nagar, Bangalore, Karnataka 
 Shree Kala Bhairava Temple, Jadigenahally, Hoskote, Bangalore, Karnataka
 Shree Bhyraveshwara Temple, Totanahalli , Nelamangala Taluk, Bangalore, Karnataka
 Sri Byraveshwara Swamy Temple siddana lane cubbonpete, Bangalore
 Kaala Bhairava Temple, Yana, Uttara Kannada 
 Kalabhairaveshvara Temple at Adichunchanagiri 
 Kaala Bhairava Temple, Dubalgundi, Near Homnabad, Bidar
 Kalabhairaveshvara Temple at Jogi Mutt, Kadri, Mangalore
 Kala Bhairava Temple, Gadag
Khala bhirava Temple, which is there in Skanada Purana, Taranagara village, Sandur Taluk, Bellary.
Mahakala Bhairava Temple,Near Gurupura Bridge, Karamogaru, Mangalore-Moodbedra Highway
Kalabhairaveshvara Temple at Guthi village, Mudigere Taluk,Chikmagalur
Nanhya Bhairaveshvara temple at Byrapura, Mudigere Taluk, Chickmagalur
Shree Kala Bhairava Prasanna temple at Dodballapura village.

Kerala 

 Njarakattu sri bhagavathi bhairava Temple, Kedamangalam
 Bhairavaswami Kshetram, Ambalappuzha
 Kalabhairava Bhoothathan Temple in Pothencode, Trivandrum.

Madhya Pradesh 

 Kal Bhairav temple, Ujjain, Madhya Pradesh
 Shri Kala Bhairav Naath Temple Adegaon Madhya Pradesh
 Shri Toriya Bhairav Temple, Panch Kuti Toriya, Datiya, Madhya Pradesh
 Bajnamath Tantrik Bhairav Temple, Jabalpur, Madhya Pradesh
 Bhairav Nath temple, Gudh, Rewa, Madhya Pradesh

Maharashtra 
Shri Kalabhairavanath Temple, Agadgaon, Tal & Dist, Ahmadnagar
Shri Kaal Bhairav Nath Hedavde Mahalaxmi Mandir, Hedavde, Hedavde Devi on River Tansa, Mumbai
 Bhairavnath Temple, Avasari (Khurd), Ambegaon, Pune
 Kaal Bhairav Temple, Kharadi, Pune
 Bhairavnath Mandir, Ankoli, Solapur
 Shree Kalbhairav Mandir, Hindale, Devgad Sindhudurg
 Kaal Bhairav Temple, Jyotiba, Wadi Ratnagiri, Kolhapur
 Kaal Bhairavnath Temple, Sonari, Paranda, Osmanabad
 The Kaal Bhairav Nath Mandir, Panchvati, Saptashrungi Devi on Rive Godavari, Nashik
 Bhairavnath Temple, Sinnar, Nashik
 The Kaal Bhairav Nath Mandir Varne, Satara
 Shri KalBhairavnath Jogeshwari Temple, A/P-Bavdhan, Wai, Satara 
 Shri KalBhairavnath Mandir, Kasba Peth, Pune (also known as Nava kal Bhairavnath Mandir)
 Shri Siddhanath Temple, Mhaswad, Tal-Man, Dist Satara
 Shri Bhairavnath Temple, Kikali, Tal-Wai, Dist Satara
 Shri Bhairavnath Temple, Thorgavan Tal Raver, Dist Jalgaon.
 Shri Kaal Bairavnath Temple Bahirwadi Taluka Newasa Dist Ahmednagar Maharashtra
 Kaal Bhairav Temple, Brahman alli, Bhind Post Office, Bhiwandi, Thane, Maharashtra.
 Kalbhairav temple, Gadhinglaj, DIST: Kolhapur, Maharashtra.
 Bhairav baba Temple, Pulgaon camp, Dist- Wardha
 Shri Bhairavnath Mandir, Jarud Tq & Dist.Beed
 Kaal Bhairavnath temple Bahirwadi (Purandar), Pune
 Kaal Bhairavnath temple Kusgao, Khed Shivapur, Pune
 Kaal Bhairavnath Temple, Mehendale Garage Chowk, near Mhatre Bridge, Erandwane, Pune - 411004
 Jagadamba Kalbhairav Temple, Maja's Wadi, Jogeshwari East, Mumbai 60, Maharashtra.
 Shri Bhairavnath and Shani Mandir, Old Mumbai-Pune Highway, Khandala, Maharashtra 
 Shri Bhairavnath Temple, Rajmachi, Maharashtra
 Shri Kalbhairav Temple Jarud, Dist: Beed, Taluka Beed

Orissa 
 Ajaikapada Bhairava Temple, Nuagaon, Jagatsinghpur, Odisha

Punjab 
 Pracheen Shri Kaal Bhairav Mandir, Dhuri, Sangrur, Punjab

Rajasthan 

 Shree Khoda Masaniya bhairav temple, Kheda Bhansol, Udaipur
 Sri Musaanya Bhairu Baba Temple at Ringus, Sikar
 Jai Shri Bhairunath Bawji Temple, Shishoda village near Nathdwara, Rajasthan
 Chomukha Bhairavji Temple, Kharkhara, Khetri, Rajasthan
 Shree DakshinMukhi Kaal Bhairav Temple Dhanapura, Pali district, Rajasthan
 Shri Kala Bhairava Temple, Amer Fort, Jaipur, Rajasthan
 Bhairuji Mandir, Village-Tehsil - Ladnun, Nagaur, Rajasthan
 Kala-Gora Bhairav Mandir, Mandore, Jodhpur, Rajasthan
 Bhairav Mandir, Barli, Jodhpur, Rajasthan
 Kala Bhairav Temple at Toliasar, Sri Dungargarh, Rajasthan
 Kodamdesar Ramdevra Temple, Jaisalmer Highway, Rajasthan
 Sri Nakoda Bhairav Jain Temple, Barmer District, Rajasthan
 Kodamdesar Bhairav mandir, dist. Bikaner [rajasthan]
 Shri Raktya Bhairav mandir, Mundali anta, Baran
 Shri Jhanjhirampurawale Bhairuji Maharaj, hanjhirampura, Baswa, dausa Rajasthan
 Shri Bavdi Vale Batuk Bhairava Temple, Kartarpura, Jaipur, Rajasthan
 Sonona khetlaji Mandir sonona near desuri Rajasthan
Kala-gora ji temple, Bhairav gate, Sawai madhopur, Rajasthan

Tamil Nadu
 Kalabairavar Temple,Melapanaiyur Village,Mudukulathur,Ramanathapuram [Dist]
[[அருள்மிகு காலபைரவர் கோவில் (Bairavar Temple)],[Morepalayam,Tiruchengode - Salem Main Rd, Namakkal]]

 Arulmigu Soundaraja Perumal Temple, Thadikombu, Dindugul 
 Kasi Kalabairavar Temple - Adiyamaan Kottai,  from Dharmapuri in Dharmapuri district
 Sri Maha Kala Bairavar Temple, Dhombaram bedu village, Uthukottai Taluk, Thiruvallur district
 Sri Kala Bairavar Temple, Thennagudi (North), Thanjavur (District), Tamil Nadu.
 Sri Kala Bairavar Temple, Oyyamaari Burial Ground, Odathurai Road, Sanjeevi Nagar, Tiruchirappalli, Tamil Nadu
 Sri Baala Kaala Bhairavar Temple at T. Vairavanpatty, near Thirukoshityur
 Kalabhairavar, Kayantha Sthanam, Nanjundapuram, Coimbatore
 Kalabhairavar, Kurunallipalayam, Vadachittur (Via), Coimbaote
 Sri Kalabhairavar Temple (Lingam shape Bhairavar), Kallukurikkai, Krishnagiri.
 Kalabhairav Temple at Adhiyaman Kottai, Dharmapuri district, Tamil Nadu
 Sri Kala Bhairava Temple pogular village, Gudiyattam, Tamil Nadu
 Sri Swarna Kala Bhairavar Peedam, Kaga Ashram, Thiruvannamalai, Tamil Nadu
 Kala Bhairava Temple, Courtallam, Tamil Nadu
 Ashta Bhairavar at Sri Kamanada Eswar temple, Aragalur, near Chinna Salem, Tamil Nadu
 Bhairavar Temple, Vairavan Patti, Karaikudi, Tamil Nadu
Sri Kottai Bairavar - Thirumayam (Pudhukottai Dist) located in national highway Pudhukottai to Rameswaram
 Bhairaveswarar Temple, Cholapuram, Kumbakonam, Tamil Nadu
 Sri Vairavamoorthy, Illupaikudi Temple, Karaikudi, Tamil Nadu
 Konguvadukanatha Swami, Kundadam, Dharapuram, Tamil Nadu
 Kala Bhairavar Temple, Pogular village, Gudiyattam Town, Tamil Nadu (3,000 years old, surrounded by mountains)
 Swarna Akarshana Bhairavar at Thadikombu Perumal Temple, Dindigul, Tamil Nadu
 Kaalabairavar Temple, Thiruneermalai, Chennai
 Maha Bhairava Rudhra Aalayam, Bhairavar Nagar, Thiruvadisoolam Road, Echankaranai, Chengalpattu, Tamil Nadu
Bairavar Koil, Thirupattur, Sivaganga dis.Tamil Nadu
 Sri Bhairavar Malai Koil, a serene hill temple in a less inhabited area near Venbedu village approx.  from Chengalpattu &  from Thiruporur.
 Sri Mahakalabhairavar Aalayam, Dhombarambedu village, Uthukottai - 602026, Thiruvallur District, Tamil Nadu.
 Sri Maha Bhiravar, Renganathapuram, Near Bodinayakkanur, Theni dt, Tamil Nadu
 Sri SwarnaBairavi Samedha Swarna Aakarshana Bairavar temple, Lloyds Colony, Royapettah, Chennai-14, Tamil Nadu
 Sri kala Bahairva temple, Kandhikuppam, Krishnagiri, Tamil Nadu
 Sri Swarna Kala Bhairavar Temple, Akkaraippatty, Salem, Tamil Nadu - 636 306.
 Sri Swarna aharshna bairavar temple, sri athmanatheswarar temple - Menambedu, Ambattur O.T, Chennai-53, Tamil Nadu
 Kala Bhairavar temple, Thagatur, Nagaipattinam, Tamil Nadu
 Kala Bhairavar temple Ramapuram,ayilam village Walaja taluk Vellore dt Tamil Nadu
 Kala Bharavar Temple, East Avani Moola Street, Near Ezhukadal Street and Pudhmandapam, Madurai

Telangana
 Sri Kalabhairava Swamy Temple at Ramareddy near Kamareddy, Nizamabad district
 Kala Bhairava Temple in Kajipalli Medak Mandal
Sri Kala Bhairava Swamy Temple, Medchal, Medchal-Malkajgiri district
 Sri Kalabhirava Swamy temple, Balaji Nagar, Suryapet, Suryapet

Uttarakhand

 Bhairavnath Temple, Kedarnath
 Bhairav Temple, Near Uttarkashi
 Bhairav Temple, Bhairon Ghati, before Gangotri
 Nadbudh Bhairava Temple, Molthi, Patti Paidulsyun, Pauri Garhwal
 Bhairon Garhi, Gumkhal, Pauri Garhwal
 Bhairav Temple, Bangdwara, Tehri Garhwal
 Eight Bhairav Temples, Almora
 Bhairav Temple, Bageshwar
 Kal Bhairav Temple, Devprayag
 Bhairavnath Temple,
 Gram Pipli-Ghurdaursyu, Pauri Garhwal, Uttarakhand
 Bhairav Temple, Rishikesh

Uttar Pradesh 
 Kala Bhairava Temple, Varanasi
 Pracheen Bada Lal Bhairav, Vidhyanchal, Mirzapur district
 Kal Bhairav Temple, Allahabad
 Kal Bhairav Temple, Shrinagar district, Mahoba
 Kaal Bhairav Temple, Balughat Shuklaganj, Unnao
 Bhairav Baba Temple, Meerut
 Bhairav Ji Temple, Jalaun, Jalaun
 Mandir Thakur Bhairon Nath Ji, Satghada, Inside Holi Gate, Mathura

West Bengal
 Bhairavsthan, submerged temples of Telkupi, Near Dhanbad

Nepal

Inside Kathmandu valley 
 Akash Bhairava (Sava Bhakku Deva or Wanga Dya), Halchowk, Kathmandu
 Akash Bhirava (Aaju:) of Indrachok, Kathmandu
 Anand Bhairav, Gyaneshwar, Kathmandu
 Bagh Bhairava, Kirtipur, Kathmandu
 Chunni Bhairav, Bhandarkhal jungle, Kathmandu
 Kaal Bhairava , Kathmandu Durbar Square, Kathmandu
 Kirtimukha Bhairava (inside the Pashupatinath Temple, Kathmandu
 Pachali Bhairav, Teku, Kathmandu
 Mahangkal Bhairav, Tudikhel, Kathmandu
 Shanta Bhairava (Majipa Lakhey Dya), Majipat, Kathmandu
 Swet Bhairava (Haatha:) of Hanumandhoka, Kathmandu
 Unmukta Bhairava (inside the Pashupatinath Temple), Kathmandu
 Batuk Bhairava temple, Lagankhel, Lalitpur
 Hayagriva Bhairava, Bungamati, Lalitpur
 Tika Bhairav, Lele, Lalitpur
 Bhairavnath temple, Taumadhi, Bhaktapur

Outside Kathmandu valley 

 Bhairabi Temple, Nuwakot, Bagmati province
 Bhairabsthan Temple, Palpa district, Lumbini province
 Kaal Bhairav Temple, Lamkichuha, Kailali district, Sudurpashchim Province
 Unmatta Bhairav, Panauti, Kavrepalanchok District, Bagmati Province

References

Bhairava temples